Bash Abaran may refer to:

Aparan, a city in Armenia
Battle of Bash Abaran, battle fought there